The Hongqi QM9 is an upcoming luxury minivan to be produced by Chinese luxury automobile manufacturer Hongqi, a subsidiary of FAW Group.

Overview
In November 2021, Hongqi's press release department unofficially revealed the brand's first minivan, the QM9 (codenamed C095), through teaser images. The Hongqi QM9 will go into trial production on January 30, 2022, and will begin full production later that year on June 30. When launch, the QM9 is set to directly compete against other premium minivans on sale in China such as the Buick GL8 and Toyota Alphard.

Specifications
The Hongqi QM9's engine options will be a 2.0-litre L4 twin-turbo engine with a 48V mild hybrid system, that outputs , and a 3.0-litre V6 supercharged engine that outputs . The QM9 will use a 7-speed dual-clutch transmission.

References

Upcoming car models
Cars of China
Minivans
QM9
Flagship vehicles